Euthamia caroliniana, known as Carolina grass-leaved goldenrod or slender goldentop is a flowering plant in the genus Euthamia, a member of the family Asteraceae. It is listed as Vulnerable due to habitat loss and disturbance within its range.

Distribution
Euthamia caroliniana is found primarily on the Atlantic Coastal Plain between Nova Scotia and eastern Texas. It also has populations in the Great Lakes region and around Lake Champlain. Inland populations are also known from Indiana to Kentucky. Within its range, it can be found in open sandy areas, such as powerline cuts in pine barrens.

Identification
Along the east coast, Carolina Goldentops only overlap with Grass-leaved Goldentop, which has wider leaves with one to three conspicuous veins (versus narrow leaves with only one vein in Carolina Goldentops).

It also overlaps with Great Plains Goldentop in the western Great Lakes and along Gulf Coast and Bushy Goldentop along the Gulf Coast.

References

caroliniana